The Journal of Abbasid Studies (JAS) is a double-blind peer-reviewed journal that publishes original research and review articles on the political, cultural, social, economic, religious and intellectual life of the Abbasid Caliphate.

References

External links

Islamic studies journals
Brill Publishers academic journals
Abbasid Caliphate
Biannual journals
Publications established in 2014